Józef Stefaniak (born 14 March 1941) is a Polish former ice hockey player. He played for Boruta Zgierz, Gryf Toruń, Pomorzanin Toruń, ŁKS Łódź, and EHC Lustenau during his career. He also played for the Polish national team at the 1964 Winter Olympics, and multiple World Championships.

References

External links
 

1941 births
Living people
Ice hockey players at the 1964 Winter Olympics
Olympic ice hockey players of Poland
People from Łęczyca County
Polish ice hockey forwards
TKH Toruń players
EHC Lustenau players
Sportspeople from Łódź Voivodeship
Polish expatriate sportspeople in Austria